Elections in Arunachal Pradesh are being conducted since 1977 to elect the members of Arunachal Pradesh Vidhan Sabha and the members of the Lok Sabha. There are 60 Vidhan Sabha constituencies and 2 Lok Sabha constituencies in the state.

Vidhan Sabha elections
The elections for the Arunachal Pradesh Vidhan Sabha held since 1978.

Lok Sabha elections 
The elections for the Lok Sabha seats in Arunachal Pradesh held since 1977.

References